Rugby at the Summer Olympics may refer to:

 Rugby union at the Summer Olympics (1900–1924)
 Rugby sevens at the Summer Olympics (2016–present)

Rugby union

Last updated after the 1924 Summer Olympics

Rugby sevens

Last updated after the 2020 Summer Olympics

Overall medal table
Sources:

Last updated after the 2020 Summer Olympics

References